Dear Eloise (simplified Chinese: 亲爱的艾洛伊丝; pinyin: Qīn'ài de ài luò yī sī) is a Chinese rock band composed of vocalist/producer Yang Haisong (杨海崧) and Sun Xia (孙霞).

Formed in Beijing in 2008, the pair are known for their lo-fi DIY recordings that combine elements of shoegaze, indie pop, noise rock and experimental music. In addition to playing all of the instruments themselves, the husband-wife duo record and edit all of the band's music in their home studio.

While they do not perform live and have released their recordings inconspicuously through the Beijing-based vinyl label Genjing Records and CD label Maybe Mars, the duo has managed to gain a loyal following in both the Chinese independent music scene and with critics abroad.

Their seventh effort, Vanishing Winter, was released on April 6, 2013 on Genjing Records. An eighth release, a split with Australian alternative rock outfit Underground Lovers, was released in August 2013 with cooperation from the Melbourne-based record label Rubber Records.

Discography

Albums 
 The Words That Were Burnt (Maybe Mars, 2010)
 美丽陌生人 (Beauty In Strangers) (Maybe Mars, 2011)
 Farewell To The Summer (Maybe Mars, 2014)
 Uncontrollable, Ice Age Stories (Maybe Mars, 2016)
 They Slipped Away From My Mind Just Like This (Maybe Mars, 2019)

Singles 
 城堡 (Castle)/如果它是美丽的 (If It's Beautiful) (Genjing, 2010)
 Song For Her/Song For Him (Genjing, 2011)
 I'll Be Your Mirror (Genjing/Bubutz, 2012)
 Man Without A Name / Haunted (Acedia) (Genjing/Rubber 2013) (Split single with Underground Lovers)
 Vanishing Winter/The Place In White Light (Genjing, 2013)
 Dive / Summer Begins II (Maybe Mars, 2019) (Split with Lonely Leary)

References

Chinese rock music groups